Joseph E. Hall House, also known as the Hall House is an early historic home located on Main Street, Brookville, Jefferson County, Pennsylvania. It was built about 1848, by pioneer lumberman Joseph Hall and is thought to be the oldest surviving residence in the town.   It is considered one of the few superb examples of the Greek Revival "temple with wings" style in mid-western and north-central Pennsylvania.  The facade features a two-story portico with four fluted Ionic order columns constructed of solid trees and a classical pediment (similar to the north facade of the White House).  After 100 years as a private residence, in 1956 the house was deeded as the Rebecca M. Arthurs Memorial Library and served as the town's public library into the late-1970s when it again became a residence.

It was added to the National Register of Historic Places in 1978.  It is located in the Brookville Historic District.

References

External links
Rebecca M. Arthurs Memorial Library website
 Hall House PA

Houses on the National Register of Historic Places in Pennsylvania
Greek Revival houses in Pennsylvania
Houses completed in 1848
Houses in Jefferson County, Pennsylvania
National Register of Historic Places in Jefferson County, Pennsylvania